Chirodipteridae is an extinct family of prehistoric lungfishes that lived during the Devonian period.

References 

Prehistoric lungfish
Devonian bony fish
Prehistoric lobe-finned fish families
Devonian first appearances
Devonian extinctions